The 1952 United States House of Representatives elections was an election for the United States House of Representatives to elect members to serve in the 83rd United States Congress. They were held for the most part on November 4, 1952, while Maine held theirs on September 8. This was the first election after the congressional reapportionment based on the 1950 Census. It also coincided with the election of President Dwight Eisenhower. Eisenhower's Republican Party gained 22 seats from the Democratic Party, gaining a majority of the House. However, the Democrats had almost 250,000 more votes (0.4%) thanks to overwhelming margins in the Solid South. It was also the last election when both major parties increased their share of the popular vote simultaneously, largely due to the disintegration of the American Labor Party and other third parties.

Outgoing President Harry Truman's dismal approval rating was one reason why his party lost its House majority. Also, continued uneasiness about the Korean War was an important factor. Joseph Martin (R-Massachusetts) became Speaker of the House, exchanging places with Sam Rayburn (D-Texas), who became the new Minority Leader.

This would be the last time Republicans would have a Majority in the House of Representatives until 1994, as despite the GOP controlling the Presidency for a majority of that time, Democrats performed vastly superior in down-ballot elections, especially in the South, which had started to drift towards Republican Presidential candidates. As of 2020, this is the last time the House changed partisan control during a presidential cycle, and the last time both houses did so simultaneously.

Overall results

Special elections 

Four special elections were held to finish terms in the 82nd United States Congress, which would end January 3, 1953.

Alabama

Arizona

Arkansas 

Arkansas lost one seat in reapportionment leaving it with 6; the existing 4th district along the western edge of the state lost some of its territory to the 3rd district in the northwest, and the rest was merged with the 7th district in the south, with minor changes to other districts.

California 

Seven new seats were added in reapportionment, increasing the delegation from 23 to 30 seats.  Two of the new seats were won by Democrats, and five by Republicans.  One Republican and one Democratic incumbents lost re-election, and a retiring Democrat was replaced by a Republican.  Overall, therefore, Democrats gained one seat and Republicans gained 7.

Colorado

Connecticut

Delaware

Florida 

Florida was redistricted from 6 districts to 8, splitting the area around Sarasota out from the Tampa-St. Petersburg based 1st district, and splitting Gainesville out from the Jacksonville-based 2nd district.

Georgia

Idaho

Illinois 

Illinois lost one seat, redistricting from 26 to 25 districts. No changes were made to the Chicago area districts, but the downstate districts were broadly reorganized, forcing incumbents Peter F. Mack Jr. (Democratic) and Edward H. Jenison (Republican) into the same district.

Indiana

Iowa

Kansas

Kentucky 

Kentucky lost one seat at reapportionment, and redistricted from 9 districts to 8, adjusting boundaries across the state and dividing the old 8th up among its neighbors.

Louisiana

Maine

Maryland 

Maryland redistricted from 6 to 7 seats, transferring territory from the 2nd to the 3rd and 4th and to a new 7th seat in the Baltimore suburbs.

, this was the last time the Republican Party held a majority of congressional districts from Maryland.

Massachusetts

Michigan 

Michigan added one seat, and divided the 17th district to form an 18th district, leaving boundaries otherwise unchanged.

Minnesota

Mississippi 

Mississippi lost 1 seat in reapportionment and redistricted from 7 seats to 6; in addition to other boundary adjustments a substantial portion of the old 4th district was moved into the 1st, and 4th district incumbent Abernethy defeated 1st district incumbent Rankin in the Democratic primary.

Missouri

Montana

Nebraska

Nevada

New Hampshire

New Jersey

New Mexico

New York 

New York redistricted from 45 seats to 43, losing a seat in Long Island and another upstate.

North Carolina

North Dakota

Ohio 

Ohio's representation was not changed at reapportionment, but redistricted its at-large district into a 23rd district and also removed the 11th district in south Ohio, creating two new districts around Cleveland.

Oklahoma 

Oklahoma was reapportioned from 8 seats to 6 and eliminated the 7th and 8th districts, moving most of their territory into the 1st and 6th and expanding other districts to compensate.

Oregon

Pennsylvania 

Pennsylvania redistricted from 33 districts to 30, eliminating 1 district in northeastern Pennsylvania and 2 in southwestern Pennsylvania.

Rhode Island

South Carolina

South Dakota

Tennessee 

Tennessee lost one seat in reapportionment, and divided the old 4th district between the old 5th and 7th districts, with other minor boundary changes.

Texas 

Texas gained one seat, adding it as an at-large district instead of redistricting.

Utah

Vermont

Virginia 

Virginia gained one seat, adding a new district in the DC suburbs and making boundary adjustments elsewhere.

Washington 

Washington gained one seat at reapportionment, adding it as an at-large district instead of redistricting.

West Virginia

Wisconsin

Wyoming

Non-voting delegates

Alaska Territory

See also
 1952 United States elections
 1952 United States Senate elections
 1952 United States presidential election
 82nd United States Congress
 83rd United States Congress

Notes

References